The 2019–20 ISU Challenger Series was held from September to December 2019. It was the sixth season that the ISU Challenger Series, a group of senior-level international figure skating competitions ranked below the ISU Grand Prix, was held.

Events 
The 2019–20 series was composed of ten events in autumn 2019.

On July 22, 2019, the ISU canceled the Asian Open Figure Skating Classic and replaced the competition with Asian Open Figure Skating Trophy on the same dates.

Medal summary

Medalists

Men

Ladies

Pairs

Ice dance

Medal standings

Challenger Series rankings 
The ISU Challenger Series rankings were formed by combining the two highest final scores of each skater or team/couple.

Men

Ladies

Pairs

Ice dance

Top scores

Men

Best total score

Best short program score

Best free skating score

Ladies

Best total score

Best short program score

Best free skating score

Pairs

Best total score

Best short program score

Best free skating score

Ice dance

Best total score

Best rhythm dance score

Best free dance score

References

External links
 ISU Challenger Series at the International Skating Union

 

ISU Challenger Series
Figure skating competitions
2019 in figure skating